“Heartbreak Beat” is a song by the British new wave band the Psychedelic Furs, originally released in 1986 as the lead single for their 1987 album Midnight to Midnight. The song was written by band members Richard Butler, John Ashton, and Tim Butler. The song also appeared on the UK music compilation Hits 5 in November 1986.

Issued as a single, "Heartbreak Beat" reached #26 on the Billboard Hot 100, and became the Psychedelic Furs' only Top 40 hit in the United States. The song also reached the top 20 of both the Billboard Mainstream Rock and Dance charts. Comparatively, the song was less successful in the United Kingdom, and peaked at #79 on the UK Singles Chart.

Track listing
7" Vinyl
 "Heartbreak Beat" (4:03)
 "New Dream" (4:54)

12" Vinyl (UK)
 "Heartbreak Beat" (New York Mix) (8:04)
 "Heartbreak Beat" (Single Mix) (4:02)
 "New Dream" (4:54)

12" Vinyl (US)
 "Heartbreak Beat" (Extended) (8:04)
 "Heartbreak Beat" (Dub) (5:41)
 "New Dream" (4:54)

12" Vinyl (US Promo)
 "Heartbreak Beat" (7" Version) (4:03)
 "Heartbreak Beat" (Album Version) (5:10)

Chart performance

References

1986 singles
The Psychedelic Furs songs
Song recordings produced by Chris Kimsey
1986 songs
Columbia Records singles
Songs written by Tim Butler
Songs written by John Ashton (musician)
Songs written by Richard Butler (singer)